The District of Columbia Jail or the D.C. Central Detention Facility  (commonly referred to as the D.C. Jail) is a jail run by the District of Columbia Department of Corrections in Washington, D.C., United States. The Stadium–Armory station serves the D.C. Jail. The majority of male inmates housed in the Central Detention Facility are awaiting adjudication of cases or are sentenced for misdemeanor offenses. Female inmates in the custody of the D.C. Department of Corrections are housed at the adjacent Correctional Treatment Facility. After the National Capital Revitalization and Self-Government Improvement Act of 1997, sentenced felons are transferred to the Federal Bureau of Prisons.

History
The current building was constructed in 1976. It replaced a jail built in 1872. In turn, this building replaced a federal penitentiary that had been torn down at the US Army Arsenal a few years earlier. Six German spies, tried in a military court, were electrocuted here in 1942, during World War II.

Programs
As of 2004, a group called the "Free Minds Book Club & Writing Workshop," came into the jail twice a week, which allowed inmates to read and write. This program allowed one inmate to change his life. The jail offers "HIV/ AIDS Prevention, Education and Intervention Services; Individual and Group Counseling Services; Hispanic Life Skills; Book Club; Street Law; Literacy Education; Religious Services; Mental Health Adjustment; and Anger Management, among other life skills development and religious services."

Conditions
In August 1995, the Jail's medical care facility was placed under court-ordered receivership, after the District was held in contempt for repeatedly failing to implement court orders...intended to ensure adequate medical services to jail inmates".  The receivership ended in September 2000.

In 2010, a long-time inmate of the D.C. Jail claimed that nine years in the D.C. Jail was equivalent to 20 years in another prison. The inmate told of moldy jail cells, questionable strip searches, broken locks on cell doors, staph infections, rodents and violent assaults. US District Judge Thomas Hogan called the conditions at the jail "a shame."

In 2013, a report noted that 165 people had attempted suicide over roughly a two-year period and four had actually committed suicide during that same time. There were three suicides over the period of two months. An HIV-positive deaf man sued the D.C. Jail, claiming he was denied medical care and was retaliated against for complaining about jail conditions.

In 2014, there was debate over health care provider services at the jail.

In 2015,  a report from the Washington Lawyers' Committee called the conditions at the jail "alarming," noting that structures were deteriorating and that drug addicts detained there need additional resources. The report recommended that the facility be replaced. The report criticized anti-suicide initiatives by the department. Mayor Muriel Bowser announced that the jail would reintroduce face-to-face visits between inmates and their relatives. Face-to-face visits were eliminated in 2012 when the jail made video conferencing the policy. The Economist reported that the jail houses people with serious mental illness for minor offenses.

Notable incidents
In 2001, several middle school students underwent a strip search during a tour of the jail. Warden Patricia Britton was subsequently fired for allegedly allowing the searches.

In 2004, Jonathan Magbie died at the D.C. Jail. Magbie was paralyzed from the neck down after being struck by a drunk driver at the age of four. He was charged with marijuana possession after police found a marijuana cigarette and a loaded gun in the vehicle in which he was stopped. Although he had never been convicted of a criminal offense and although he required private nursing care for as much as 20 hours a day, Magbie was given a ten-day sentence in the D.C. jail in September 2004 by D.C. Superior Court Judge Judith E. Retchin. Lacking a ventilator, he died in city custody four days later. This provoked a series of op-ed pieces in The Washington Post by columnist Colbert I. King. Magbie's mother, with the help of the ACLU, filed a lawsuit accusing the District government and Greater Southeast Community Hospital of failing to give him proper care. The lawsuit was settled out of court.

In 2010, it was reported that there were six stabbings over the course of several months.

In 2012, a man with a history of mental illness hanged himself at the jail.

In 2013, the District of Columbia agreed to pay $6.2 million to settle allegations that the city had a practice of holding inmates at the D.C. Jail past their release date and of wrongfully strip searching inmates who were supposed to be released. In a related case in federal court, a jury found that inmates were unconstitutionally overdetained at the D.C. Jail between 2007 and 2008, but that the government wasn't liable because they didn't find evidence of "deliberate indifference" to the inmates' rights. A corrections officer at the D.C. Jail was arrested for having marijuana in his locker at the jail after a police dog detected the presence of the drug.

In 2014, a retired officer at the D.C. Jail sued the department of corrections for the right to carry guns after he reported receiving threats from inmates that he supervised. A former D.C. Jail inmate sued the city for being ordered to clean up a cell after a suicide.

In 2015, the wife of a man who committed a suicide at the jail filed a lawsuit against D.C. Mayor Muriel Bowser and the D.C. Department of Corrections for wrongful death.

Notable inmates
Joel Castón, first incarcerated person in D.C. to win an election in the city

References

Jails in the United States
Government buildings completed in 1976
Government buildings in Washington, D.C.
Government of the District of Columbia
Government buildings completed in 1872